Todd Blackadder (born 20 September 1971) is a retired New Zealand rugby union player and professional rugby coach. He captained the national team, the All Blacks, 14 times playing a total of 25 games and 12 tests. Blackadder captained the Crusaders to three Super Rugby titles during his time with the franchise while also winning two NPC titles with Canterbury. Blackadder coached the Crusaders for 9 seasons, without winning a title.

Blackadder began his career as a blindside flanker but changed to lock in 1998.

Early years 
Blackadder was born in Rangiora, New Zealand, where he grew up working on his grandfathers farm. Blackadder was introduced into rugby by his father and uncles but left Rangiora College early without making the 1st XV. After leaving school, Blackadder took up a welding apprenticeship which moved him north to Collingwood where he left his mark with the Nelson Bays age-group selectors before being eventually selected for the New Zealand Under 19 tour of Australia. Blackadder left his welding apprenticeship to return to the farm where he worked for his future father-in-law, Brian McKay. Blackadder and McKay's daughter married and returned to Rangiora before working as a security guard and buying a courier.

Playing career
Blackadder made his senior representative debut for Nelson Bays against Marlborough in 1990.

NPC 
Blackadder made his debut for Canterbury in 1991 when he returned to the province with his wife. In 1997 Blackadder led Canterbury to its first NPC title in 14 years when they defeated Counties Manukau 44–13 in the final. Blackadder also won the Ranfurly Shield on several occasions including defeating Waikato in 1994 while he was also present when Canterbury ended Waikato's three-year stranglehold on the shield in 2000. Blackadder played 126 games for Canterbury over his 11 years for the province. His final game for Canterbury was the 2001 NPC final against Otago which Canterbury won 30–19.

Super Rugby 
Blackadder was part of the inaugural Crusaders team in 1996 and would go onto lead the side to its first Super Rugby title in 1998 after they defeated the Blues in the final 20–13. Blackadder would go onto lift the trophy again the following year in 1999 and again in 2000 as the Crusaders became the most successful franchise in Super Rugby history.

International debut 
Blackadder played at the inaugural Rugby World Cup Sevens in 1993 after he was called in to the side as an injury replacement for Marc Ellis.

Blackadder was first selected for the All Blacks in 1995 and made his test debut against England at Dunedin on 20 June 1998. Blackadder spent several years outside the team including missing the 1999 Rugby World Cup which New Zealand lost to France in the semi-finals which resulted in coach John Hart resigning from the side. Following Harts departure, Wayne Smith was appointed head coach of the All Blacks and promptly named Blackadder captain succeeding Taine Randell.  The decision was met with fanfare by some who liked Blackadders simple uncomplicated approach. However, his locking ability and subsequently position leading the All Blacks was often under the microscope although All Blacks great Jonah Lomu stated that he was one of the finest captains he ever played under. Following one season captaining the All Blacks, Blackadder was replaced by hooker Anton Oliver as he failed to make the 30-man squad in the lead up to the Tri-Nations before departing for Scotland.

Scotland 
Believing in the need for a change of scenery Blackadder departed New Zealand at the end of 2001 joining Scottish side Edinburgh Gunners. Blackadder would eventually move into a coaching role with the side.

Coaching career
Blackadder was first named as assistant forwards coach of Scotland's first foreign head coach Matt Williams, and became the forwards coach of the Edinburgh Gunners under Frank Hadden before Hadden replaced Williams and Blackadder was named as Edinburgh's head coach for the remainder of the 2005 season.

Blackadder, who made a significant impact both playing and coaching in Edinburgh and Scotland confirmed his departure from Edinburgh to return to New Zealand in 2006.

Tasman 
On return to New Zealand, Blackadder took up a role as the Director of Rugby for the Tasman Rugby Union as Nelson Bays and Marlborough amalgamated to form Tasman while also offering assistance to Robbie Deans and the Crusaders.

In 2007 Tasman coach Dennis Brown stepped down with Blackadder replacing him coaching the side for the 2008 Air New Zealand Cup. In only their second year Tasman finished the 2008 season with 4 wins, 1 draw and 6 losses.

Crusaders 
Following the departure of former coach Robbie Deans from the Crusaders, Blackadder was named as the sides new head coach ahead of the 2009 Super 14 Rugby Season. Blackadder led the Crusaders to the semi-finals in his first year in charge losing to eventual champions the Bulls in Pretoria despite winning only one out of their first five matches at the start of the season. In his second year in charge, the Crusaders again fell to the Bulls in South Africa, this time 39–24. The 2011 season was a tough one for the side following the devastating Christchurch earthquakes which aside from causing loss of life and severely damaging the city, the earthquakes also wrecked their home ground at Jade Stadium. Amazingly the Crusaders managed to make the final that year after taking games throughout the wider Crusaders catchment area, New Zealand and even to Twickenham, however, the side fell tantalisingly close to a deserved victory as the Reds won their first title 18–13. In 2012 the Crusaders were knocked out by eventually champions the Chiefs 20–17 in the semi-finals before the Chiefs, on route to their second title, beat the Crusaders again in the semi-finals by the tighter margin of 20–19. In 2014, the Crusaders returned to the final but again fell short 33–32 against the Waratahs due to a last minute controversial penalty goal struck by Bernard Foley. In 2015 the Crusaders failed to make the finals, the first time Blackadder had not made them although the Crusaders extended his contract for another year. In late 2015 it was announced that the 2016 Super Rugby Season would be Blackadder's last coaching the Crusaders after eight years at the helm. In his final year the Crusaders were knocked out by beaten finalists the Lions 42–25 in Johannesburg.

During his time coaching the Crusaders, Blackadder guided the side to two Grand Finals firstly in 2011 against the Reds and then again in 2014 against the Waratahs.

Bath 
Blackadder was appointed Director of Rugby at Bath Rugby ahead of the 2016/17 English Premiership rugby season together with Crusaders assistant coach Tabai Matson who was appointed head coach. While Matson was forced to return home to New Zealand due to a family illness, Blackadder attempted to return the club to its former glory but ultimately could only manage consecutive top six finishes before on 17 April 2019 it was announced that he would be leaving the club at the end of the 2018/19 season.

Toshiba 
On his release from his final year of his contract with Bath, Blackadder announced that he would be joining the Toshiba Brave Lupus in the Japanese Top League as their new head coach.

Personal life 
Todd's son Ethan Blackadder currently plays for the Crusaders after making his debut for the franchise in 2018.

On 3 July 2021 Ethan followed on from his father when he was selected to play for the All Blacks against Tonga at Eden Park.

Notes and references

External links

1971 births
Living people
Barbarian F.C. players
Canterbury rugby union players
Crusaders (rugby union) players
Nelson Bays rugby union players
New Zealand international rugby union players
New Zealand rugby union coaches
New Zealand rugby union players
People educated at Rangiora High School
Rugby union locks
Rugby union players from Rangiora